Long Lake is a  lake in northeastern Montmorency County, Michigan. The lake is primarily in Montmorency Township, although the southernmost portion is located in Hillman Township, as well as part of the Mackinaw State Forest.

Features 
Long Lake consists of two distinct sections divided by a  channel. In the larger northern section of the lake sits a small island. Also in the north of the lake sits a small bay known as Ghost Bay due to the treacherous floor and taller trees surrounding the bay limiting sunlight.

The lake is a popular summer fishing and boating destination. Common fish in the lake include northern pike, bluegill, smallmouth bass, largemouth bass, rock bass, yellow perch, walleye, and very rarely rainbow trout. rainbow trout used to be stocked in the lake many years ago, so there’s probably not many left.

See also 

 Thunder Bay River
 List of lakes in Michigan

References 

Lakes of Michigan
Lakes of Montmorency County, Michigan